The Global Climate Action Summit was held September 12–14, 2018 in San Francisco, California.

The summit was hosted by California Governor Jerry Brown and aimed to address climate change by bringing together non-state actors including elected leaders at the state and local level. The summit was held at the Moscone Convention Center in San Francisco. Two organisations Brown helped found came into play: the Under2 Coalition and America's Pledge. Many leaders of taking action on climate change were present: Al Gore, Patricia Espinosa, Jane Goodall, and prominent scientists and researchers. Also present were celebrities such as Alec Baldwin, Harrison Ford, and Dave Matthews.

At the summit, a group of twenty-nine organisations announced a commitment of $4 billion to combat climate change over the next five years. The commitment was the largest philanthropic investment made addressing climate change to date.

Importantly, the outcome of the Summit provided encouragement to governments as they finalized the implementation guidelines of the Paris Agreement in Poland in December 2018. It guided them in preparing their national climate action plans in 2020, and gave them bold options and examples for change in designing their short and long-term climate strategies.

References

External links 

 Official website

Climate change conferences
2018 in the environment
2018 in San Francisco
2018 in science
Jerry Brown
September 2018 events in the United States